The Actor and the Savages is a 1975 Romanian drama film directed by Manole Marcus. Inspired by the life of actor Constantin Tănase, it stars Toma Caragiu. It was entered into the 9th Moscow International Film Festival.

Cast
 Toma Caragiu as Costica Caratase
 Mircea Albulescu as Ionel Fridman
 Tricy Abramovici as Negreasca
 Zephi Alsec as Minister of Interior
 George Paul Avram as Puiu Mugur
 Ferenc Bencze as Peasant
 Carmen Berbecaru as Marioara
 Ion Besoiu as Gutză Popescu
 Maria Chira as Caratase's Daughter
 Cornel Ciupercescu as Legionnaire
 Ioana Craciunescu as Student
 Mircea Diaconu as Commissioner Radu Toma
 Ștefan Thury as George, the choreographer.

Production
The movie scenario has been written by Titus Popovici and it first name was  "Actor, policeman and…savages". As the actors who played in the movie remembered today, the main role was written for Toma Caragiu. When the movie director and production company finalized "ideological and artistic conception", the scenario was approved by the State Committee on Culture and the Arts on 8 March 1974.

On March 16, 1974, the film entered into the production phase.  In the period from 3 June – 17 September 1974 the film shooting took place. In 65 days of movie shooting, the team have work over 10 hours per day. On 4 April 1975, Dumitru Popescu watched the movie and the re-montage and texts inputs were required. On 21 April 1975, the standard copy was finished. On 26 December 1974, the standard copy was finalized. Production costs amounted to 4,850,000 RON.

There were a number of mix-ups during the filming. In one scene, Caratase finds in the bed a cut-off hand left by the Legionnaires to frighten him. In the scene the real hand was used, the hand was brought from the morgue. The next day it was thrown out into the garbage bin and then, someone found it. The investigation was started but then stopped, when it was revealed that this is the garbage left the after the movie shooting. The gun used in the movie by the Commissioner Radu Toma was the real one. The gun was given to the actor Mircea Diaconu, by the Capitan of the security services, only for the moment when the related scene was shot and after that he took it back. The Capitan of the security service refused to left the gun to the actor before the scene, so that the actor could have a bit of practice with it.

When Caratase is saying his final monologue, the actor is disguised in Hitler and is satirizing the fascist spirit, and then, he is taken backstage. According to the scenario, the main character has to die in bed, but Toma Caragiu insisted that main character should die "standing." For the first time, in socialist Romania, in the movie has appeared a Romanian king; Sergiu Nicolaescu found this insulting.

The music for the movie was composed by George Grigoriu and includes 57 minutes of original music, arrangements and musical "fantasies". The lyrics were written by Ion Vasilescu and Mişu Iancu, the songs being played by Carmen Berbecaru and Tricy Abramovici. The Funny Couplets were written by Dan Mihăescu and Grigore Pop.

References

External links
 
  Ciprian Plăiaşu, "«Actorul şi sălbaticii», un strigăt mut la adresa dictaturii comuniste" , Historia, September 2011

1975 films
1975 drama films
1970s Romanian-language films
Romanian drama films